Whitefoot is an electoral ward in the London Borough of Lewisham. Whitefoot is also on the Prime Meridian.

Part of the South Eastern Main Line railway between Hither Green and Grove Park stations marks the whole eastern border of the ward. The western border is marked partly by some of the Catford Loop Line, between Bellingham and Beckenham Hill stations, and small parts of two A roads, South End Lane (A2218 road) and Bromley Road (A21 road). Although railway lines make much of the wards boundaries, no train stations are located within Whitefoot.

Whitefoot is covered by two postcode districts,  covering the south and  covering the north; most of their common boundary follows Whitefoot Lane. Hither Green Cemetery is located on the east side of the ward, and Forster Memorial Park in the west.

One of the ward's councillors from 2010 to 2019 was Labour's Janet Daby, who resigned to concentrate on her role as the MP for Lewisham East, which includes Whitefoot in its boundaries. She won the parliamentary seat at a 2018 by-election. In 2006, the Liberal Democrats won all three ward seats. Daby gained one in 2010, before the other two seats were gained by Labour in 2014. , all three seats are held by Labour.

From 2022, Whitefoot will be replaced by the new Catford South, Hither Green and Downham wards.

References

Wards of the London Borough of Lewisham
Grove Park, Lewisham